I, Jane Doe is a 1948 American drama war film directed by John H. Auer and written by Lawrence Kimble and Decla Dunning. The film stars Ruth Hussey, John Carroll, Vera Ralston, Gene Lockhart, John Howard and Benay Venuta.

Plot

When the police find a French woman next to the bullet-ridden body of Stephen Curtis, she refuses to give her identity. She is arrested and goes on trial as "Jane Doe", and is convicted of murder and sentenced to death.

Stephen's widow Eve Curtis suddenly turns up. A former attorney, Eve decides to return to her practice and personally represent her husband's condemned killer. It is discovered that Jane Doe is several months pregnant. Her execution is delayed until after the baby is born, at which point a persuasive Eve gains her a new hearing in court.

Jane Doe tells her story. Her real name is Annette Dubois. She was in France on the day the American pilot Stephen Curtis's plane was shot down by anti-aircraft fire. After hiding him at great risk and faking Stephen's death to fool German soldiers searching for him, they become lovers. Stephen leaves but promises to come back to her. The war ends but he never returns.

Ashamed to tell her family what happened, Annette travels to New York City where he lived, finds Stephen and intends to shoot him. Someone else is there with a gun ahead of her, however: Eve, equally angry with Stephen for making her quit work as a lawyer and wait for him to return, then betraying her.

Cast   
Ruth Hussey as Eve Meredith Curtis
John Carroll as Stephen Curtis
Vera Ralston as Annette Dubois / Jane Doe
Gene Lockhart as Arnold Matson
John Howard as William Hilton
Benay Venuta as Phyllis Tuttle
Adele Mara as Marga-Jane Hastings
Roger Dann as Julian Aubert
James Bell as Judge Bertrand
Leon Belasco as Duroc
John Litel as Horton
Eric Feldary as Reporter
Francis Pierlot as Father Martin
Marta Mitrovich as Marie
John Albright as Reporter

References

External links 
 

1948 films
1940s English-language films
American war drama films
1940s war drama films
Republic Pictures films
Films directed by John H. Auer
Films scored by Heinz Roemheld
American black-and-white films
1948 drama films
1940s American films